Stordalsvatnet is a lake in the municipality of Åfjord in Trøndelag county, Norway.  The lake is located on the Stordalselva river which flows into the Åfjorden.  The lake lies between the villages of By (on the east end) and Årnes (on the west end).

See also
List of lakes in Norway

References

Åfjord
Lakes of Trøndelag